Daniel Marsden "Danny" Widdicombe is a musician from Queensland.

Career

In 2008 Danny Widdicombe, on resonator guitar and vocals, formed a country blues band the Wilson Pickers alongside John Bedggood on fiddle, mandolin and backing vocals, Andrew Morris on acoustic guitar and vocals, Sime Nugent on harmonica, guitar and backing vocals and Ben Salter on banjo and vocals. He also performs in a duo with Morris and has a solo career.

At 19 years old, Widdicombe was diagnosed with leukaemia. In 2011 he released a solo album, Find Someone, which he completed while his leukaemia returned.

In 2019, Widdicombe teamed up with instrumental jazz trio Trichotomy for album Between the Lines. Trichotomy's Sean Foran is on keyboards, John Parker on drums and Samuel Vincent on double bass, while Widdicombe plays guitar, pedal steel and sings.

Awards

Queensland Music Awards
The Queensland Music Awards (previously known as Q Song Awards) are annual awards celebrating Queensland, Australia's brightest emerging artists and established legends. They commenced in 2006.

 (wins only)
|-
| 2007
| himself
| QMusic Encouragement Award
| 
|-
| 2021
| "Falling" (with Kristin Berardi and Trichotomy)
| Jazz Award
| 
|-

Discography

Studio albums

References

External links

Living people
Musicians from Queensland
1987 births
21st-century Australian singers
21st-century Australian male singers